is a Japanese singer-songwriter. She is signed to Sony Music Japan International.

Her latest mini album, My Road ~ Songs for Guin Saga was released on August 26, 2009. Her fifth album planned to be released on March 31, 2011, as she stated on her blog. But, somehow she postponed it. Her most recent album was released on April 27, 2011. The album's title is "A New Story"

Biography
Kanon was born in Japan and lived much of her childhood abroad. Growing up in a western world led her to pick up many such habits and customs, one of which includes a fluent tongue in English. She began participating in a choir at age 13, in which she acquired a fair amount of interest in classical vocalization as well as vocal technique. Kanon grew to appreciate famous composers such as Handel and Chopin. Little did she know that this timely love of classical music would mature and blossom into what will become the cornerstone of her career as an artist.

She debuted in July 2002 with her first live performance shortly after graduating the Queensland Conservatorium in Australia. A year later, Kanon released [Alleluia], a mini-album containing various songs in her own piano self-accompaniment. That same year she was invited to perform live in Russia at the Moscow Baptist Church, the Red-Plaza stage, and at a home for the elderly. She was very popular with the crowds and was deemed a highly regarded Japanese representative. The first year-and-a-half of her career proved to be a fantastic display of vocal prowess, but also, in particular, lacked in original compositions. It wasn't until February 2004 when Kanon released the album [Hymn of Grace], this one being the first to include songs written and composed by her. Prior to this release she solely sang covers of songs (usually ones that fall under the category of popular folk songs) indigenous to various regions of the world.

Equipped with a beautiful face and a voice to match, Kanon aspired to reach the pinnacle of her potential, possibly out of a desire to far exceed the positive feedback from listeners all around the world. They say her voice is "one that heals," which is an accurate description considering her soothing vocals and extensive range. Sony Music Japan International recognized her talents and together they released her first single [KISEKI Song of Love] in October 2004.

The following year was busy, portentous to Kanon's promotion now that she had her newly signed contract under Sony Music. June 2005 opened up with her album [Primary Flowers] as well as an invitation to sing Japan's national anthem during the 2006 FIFA World Cup Germany-Asia public showing. She ended the year with a flowering demonstration and a live performance in Tokyo in October. The release of her mini-album [Destiny] was complement to this display.

In 2006, Kanon released three singles, [Kokoro], [My Destiny/Serenade], and [Brand New Breeze]. Her December album [Sanctuary] became the accumulation of her 2006 work with a few new additions. Kanon was invited to perform at MIDEM 2007 opening the 2007 year in January as Japan's representative; this was very much an honor as it was enjoyable for her. Even after the significant privileges and eulogies bestowed unto Kanon, her style still reflects that of her essence – contemporary classical.

Tie-ins are also a part of Kanon's routine and plays in her overall promotion. Her song "Brand New Breeze" is being used in the opening sequence of the current anime Kiniro no Corda ~primo passo~. In the videogame industry, one of Kanon's most well-known endeavors is her collaboration with avex trax to aid in the completion of Namco's RPG Tales of Legendia, in which she sang as lead vocalist in a few of the games’ tracks. In fact, visiting the provided link will direct you to the game's official site, where a sample of one of those songs can be heard. One song in particular from the Tales of Legendia Original Soundtrack, "Tori wa Naki, Boku wa Utau" ("The Bird Chirps, I Sing"), has captivated fans across the globe, thus increasing the number of listeners to what it is today.

Career
She debuted in 2003 with a mini album titled Alleluia -Piano & Voice-. As of year 2008, she already has 5 singles, 4 studio albums and 2 mini albums released and her latest appearance is at NHK Studio Park Kara Konnichiwa on March 19, 2008.

Collaborations
As for songs on her albums, she often does compositions herself, however occasionally collaborated with other composers such as Saint-Preux and Francesco Sartori.

Discography

Singles

Wings to Fly～翼をください／虹／明日への鼓動
Wings to Fly～翼をください　＜作詞：山上路夫　作曲：村井邦彦　編曲・英語詞：カノン＞
虹　＜作詞・作曲：カノン　編曲：北浦正尚＞
明日への鼓動　＜作詞･作曲：カノン　編曲：スパム春日井＞
Wings to Fly～翼をください　[Instrumental]
虹　[Instrumental]
明日への鼓動　[Instrumental]

Kiseki Song of Love
This single is released on October 20, 2004, while the catalogue number is SICL-95.

Kiseki Song of Love 
Composition/lyrics: Kanon
Memories of Summer time
English lyrics: Kanon
Kiseki Song of Love (Instrumental)
Memories of Summer time (Instrumental)

Gloria
Gloria
Composition/lyrics: Kanon
Wings to fly ~ Tsubasa wo Kudasai 
Arrangement/English lyrics: Kanon
Gloria (Instrumental)
 Angel Heart(Anime by Tsukasa Hōjō) Soundtrack

Kokoro
Kokoro 
Kiseki Song of Love (Piano Version)
Kokoro (Instrumental)

My Destiny/Serenade
It was released on May 24, 2006, and the catalogue number is SICL-139.

My Destiny
Composition/arrangement/lyrics: Kanon
Serenade
Composition/lyrics: Kanon
My Destiny (Instrumental)
Serenade (Instrumental)

Brand New Breeze
This is released on November 22, 2006, catalogue number is SICL-149.

Brand New Breeze
Composition/lyrics: Kanon
The Power
Composition/arrangement/lyrics: Kanon
Brand New Breeze (Instrumental)
The Power (Instrumental)

Studio albums

Hymn of Grace
Released on February 18, 2004; catalogue number VCCM-2001.

 – Kanon
Gloria – Kanon
 – Antonio Vivaldi
The water is wide – English Folk Lullaby
 – Irish Folk Lullaby

Calling you – Bob Telson
Ave Maria – Schubert
Ave Maria – Kanon
Loving Grace – Kanon
The Light – Kanon
 – Andrew Lloyd Webber

Primary Flowers
Released on June 22, 2005, catalogue number: SICL-110.

My Name is...
Composer/arranger: Kanon
Kiseki Song of Love

Composition/arrangement/lyrics: Kanon
Wings to fly ~ Tsubasa wo Kudasai (cathedral version)
English lyrics: Kanon
Believe
Composition/arrangement/lyrics: Kanon
Theme from Vocalise (Interlude)
Futari 
Composition: Saint-Preux
Gloria
Tenderly
Composition/lyrics: Kanon
Can't Help Falling in Love
Luigi Creatore/George David Weiss/Hugo Peretti
Arranger: Kanon
Daiya Mondo 
Composition/lyrics: Kanon
SHINE
Lullabye (Good Night My Angel)

Sanctuary
Released on November 28, 2007, catalogue number is SICL-173.

Brand New Breeze (based on Elgar's Salut d'Amour
The Power
Blue (based on Gershwin's Rhapsody in Blue
Composition/arrangement/lyrics: Kanon
Kokoro (album mix) (based on Beethoven's Piano Sonata No. 8 (Beethoven)
Composition/arrangement/lyrics: Kanon
Subete 
Composition/lyrics: Kanon
Tsuki  (based on Debussy's Clair De Lune
Composition/arrangement/lyrics: Kanon
A Parting Blessing (Interlude) (Traditional)
My Destiny (based on Rachmanioff's Vocalise
Good Old Days
Composition/arrangement/lyrics: Kanon
Serenade (album mix) (based on Tchaikovsky's Serenade for Strings (Tchaikovsky)
Composition/arrangement/lyrics: Kanon
If Ye Love Me
Composer: Thomas Tallis
As One
Composition/lyrics: Kanon
Life
Composition/arrangement/lyrics: Kanon

Precious
This album was released on November 18, 2007, and the catalogue number is SICL-173

Composition/arrangement/lyrics: Kanon

Composition/lyrics: Kanon
Let It Snow featuring WISE
Composer: Kanon
Lyricist: Kanon, WISE
Brand New Breeze featuring Stella Quintet Players Side
Composition/lyrics: Kanon
You Raise Me Up
Carry On
Composition/arrangement/lyrics: Kanon
Nella Fantasia
Composer: Ennio Morricone
Lyricist: Chiara Ferrau
Arranger: Kanon
Time To Say Goodbye
Composer: Francesco Sartori
Lyricist: Lucio Quarantotto/English lyrics: Frank Peterson

Lyricist: Kanon
O Come All ye faithful (traditional)
Kiseki Song of Love featuring Stella Quintet Players Side
Composition/lyrics: Kanon
Christmas Medley

A New Story
This album was released on April 27, 2011. Collaboration album release from Kanon and Nobuo Uematsu ("Final Fantasy" series). Features tracks from "Final Fantasy" series. The catalogue number is SICL-239

Prelude 
Final Fantasy Main Theme 
You Are The Light
Eyes On Me (Final Fantasy Series)
Far Away
Guin Saga Medley
Taisetsu na Koto 
Nakama Wo Motomete 
Shalom
Blessed by the Light
Wings to Fly (remix version)
Toberu Mono

Mini albums

Alleluia -Piano and Voice-
This album was released on July 2, 2003. It was her debut album. The singer herself did all songs in this album, its composition and lyrics, except for Alleluia (Arranged version). The catalogue number is MSCV-2007

Alleluia
By being yourself
Your Love
Saigo 
Alleluia (Arranged version)

Destiny
Released on October 26, 2005, catalogue number is SICL-124

Destiny
Composition/arrangement/lyrics: Kanon
Sanctus
Composition/arrangement/lyrics: Kanon
Lascia ch'io pianga (English Hymn version)
Composer: G.F Handel
Arranger: Kanon
Gloria (English version)
Composition/lyrics: Kanon
My Destiny
SHINE -tranquilizer mix- remixed by TOMISIRO

My Road~ Songs for Guin Saga
Released on August 26, 2009. The album contained songs for an anime : Guin Saga

Saga~This is My Road
Mariusu no Uta(マリウスの歌)
Saga~This is My Road (Orgel Version)
Where'er you go~Cavalleria Rustican
Todokanu Omoi~Moonlight(届かぬ想い～Moonlight)
Where'er you go~Cavalleria Rusticana (Orgel Version)
Saga~This is My Road (English Version)

Notes
Kiseki Song of Love was chosen as J-WAVE GOOD MORNING TOKYO's Olympic theme.
The single Kokoro is the campaign song for the movie, Duelist
My Destiny is the third ending for the anime series, Angel Heart and her other single, Gloria/Serenade is the insert song for the same series as well.
Brand New Breeze became the opening theme for the anime series, Kin’iro no Corda ~primo passo~. Furthermore, she guest starred in episode 24 as herself.
As One, one of the tracks in her album, Sanctuary is the theme song for NHK's program, Autumn's 3 Biggest Open Groove 2006.
 has been featured in the Japanese broadcast of the TV drama series, Brothers and Sisters.
Wings to Fly ~ Tsubasa wo Kudasai is an insert song for the NHK TV novel, Chiri to Techin.

Appearances

TV
NHK Studio Park Kara Konnichiwa – March 19, 2008

TV animation
Kin'iro no Corda ~primo passo~ – Guest starred as herself
Guin Saga Ending Song – This is my Road

Live
Final Fantasy Distant World's Concert Guest Vocalist in Sydney, Singing Suteki Da Ne and Distant Worlds ~ April 15, 2011, and April 16, 2011.

References

External links
Kanon's Production Official Website 
Kanon @ Sony Music Japan Online 

1980 births
Living people
Singers from Tokyo
Japanese classical musicians
Opera crossover singers
Japanese-language singers
Japanese voice actresses
Queensland Conservatorium Griffith University alumni
21st-century Japanese singers
21st-century Japanese women singers

tl:Kanon